Niemce  is a village in Lublin County, Lublin Voivodeship, in eastern Poland. It is the seat of the gmina (administrative district) called Gmina Niemce.

The village has a population of approximately 5,000.

References

Villages in Lublin County